The red-rumped parrot (Psephotus haematonotus), also known as the red-backed parrot or grass parrot, is a common bird of south-eastern Australia, particularly in the Murray-Darling Basin.

Taxonomy
The red-rumped parrot was described by John Gould in 1838 as Platycercus haematonotus from a specimen collected in New South Wales. He felt it was intermediate between the genera Platycercus and Nanodes, placing it in the former. He gave it its species name on account of its red rump.

It is the type species for the genus Psephotus. It was long presumed to be closely related to the mulga parrot, however analysis of multiple genetic material shows it to be an early offshoot of a group containing the genera Platycercus and Barnardius. Hence all other species in the genus have been moved to the new genus Psephotellus, leaving the red-rumped parrot as the sole member in the now monotypic genus.

The IOC has designated red-rumped parrot as its official common name. It is also known as red-backed parrot and grass parrot.

Description
The male's plumage is a bright emerald-green with yellow underparts, a brick-red rump and blue highlights on the wings and upper back. The female's plumage is less vibrant, with pale olive underparts, dull green wings and back and blue-black wingtips. The characteristic red rump is only found in the male.

Behavior

Red-rumped parrots can be found in pairs or flocks in open country with access to water. They avoid the coast and the wetter, more heavily wooded areas. Clearing of large tracts of forest and the provision of water for stock has probably extended their range. They are often seen in suburban parks and gardens. Their green plumage provides such a good camouflage in ankle length grasses that they can hide quite effectively until the viewer is only 10–20 metres away.

They spend a great deal of time feeding on the ground, and often call to one another with an attractive .

Breeding
Like many parrots, red-rumped parrots nest in tree hollows or similar places, including fenceposts and stumps. They lay 3-6 white eggs around 2 or so centimetres. Breeding usually takes place in spring (September-November); however, in the dryer inland areas, breeding can occur at any time of year in response to rainfall.

Aviculture

Red rumps are bred easily in captivity if provided with necessary flight space and a large nesting box. Breeders usually use peat and wood shavings as bedding for the nests, birds like to arrange the beds to their likings. As soon as mating has occurred the hen will deposit 4 to 7 eggs which she will brood for about 20 days. Red rump hens will not leave the nest box whilst on eggs and not even human checking will make them leave their eggs alone. The eggs will hatch around 30 days after laying. Care must be taken to remove the chicks as soon as they fledge or else the cock may attack his own offspring. One-year-old birds are sexually mature. Incubation from the second egg onwards. The brooding hen is fed by her partner outside the nest.

Colour mutations have been bred through aviculture. Yellow red-rumped parrots are readily available in the market.

Housing
Red-rumped parrots do well in aviaries and cages. They do not like crowded spaces and will sometimes be aggressive towards other birds if they do not have enough space. Red-rumped parrots can also be hand-reared, provided that they have a large cage and are taken out of their cage on a daily basis to prevent boredom, as it may result in the parrot pulling out its feathers to occupy itself.

Lifespan
In captivity, if properly cared for, these birds will live from 15 to 32 years.

Notes

References

External links 
 

red-rumped parrot
red-rumped parrot
Birds of South Australia
Birds of Victoria (Australia)
Endemic birds of Australia
red-rumped parrot
Taxa named by John Gould